Rawlinson Bridge was the first railway station in the Borough of Chorley in Lancashire, England. The station was located in the village of Heath Charnock and was situated on the Bolton to Preston Railway. The station opened on 4 February 1841 by act of Parliament, the Bolton and Preston Railway Company had constructed a link with the Manchester line comprising nine and a half miles of railway to a station which was to be a temporary terminus as the railway continued to be built towards Chorley. Four years later on 22 December 1841 the line had reached Chorley and was superseded by more centralised stations at Chorley and Adlington.

No traces of the former terminus remain although after closure the site became home of the junction linking the mineral railway which served Ellerbeck Colliery to the main line. This line and the colliery closed in the 1960s.

References

Disused railway stations in Chorley
Former Lancashire and Yorkshire Railway stations
Railway stations in Great Britain opened in 1841
Railway stations in Great Britain closed in 1841